The 1959 Bluebonnet Bowl was a college football postseason bowl game between the TCU Horned Frogs and the Clemson Tigers. This was the first ever Bluebonnet Bowl, a bowl game that usually featured a team from Texas against an out-of-state opponent, with 19 out of the 29 games in this series involving a team from Texas, or from the SWC.

Background
This was TCU's third Southwest Conference title in five seasons. Clemson was the first school to play in two bowls in the same calendar year, with their third Atlantic Coast Conference title in four years. They were looking to win a bowl game for the first time since 1950.

Game summary
Clemson started the scoring with a 22-yard field goal by Lon Armstrong, but TCU’s struck back with a 19-yard pass from Jack Redding to Harry Moreland with 5:45 left in the first half, to give the Frogs a 7-3 halftime lead. The game went scoreless in the third period, but in the fourth quarter, Harvey White threw a pass to Gary Barnes, who galloped in for a touchdown to give the Tigers the lead. Two plays later, Donald George's pass was intercepted by Armstrong. Clemson scored 13 more points with the help of Lowndes Shingler, as the Tigers won 23-7. Shingler ran for 65 yards on 3 carries, and threw for 24 yards on 2 for 4 passing. White went 4 for 9 with 69 yards passing and 1 interception.

Aftermath
The Horned Frogs would return to the Bluebonnet Bowl just once more, 25 years later in 1984. The Tigers did not win a bowl game until 1978.

Statistics

References

Bluebonnet Bowl
Bluebonnet Bowl
Clemson Tigers football bowl games
TCU Horned Frogs football bowl games
December 1959 sports events in the United States
Bluebonnet Bowl